In mathematical group theory, the root datum of a connected split reductive algebraic group over a field is a generalization of a root system that determines the group up to isomorphism. They were introduced by Michel Demazure in SGA III, published in 1970.

Definition
A root datum consists of a quadruple
,
where 
 For each , .

If  does not contain  for any , then the root datum is called reduced.

The root datum of an algebraic group
If  is  a reductive algebraic group over an algebraically closed field  with a split maximal torus   then its root datum is a quadruple 
, 
where 
 is the lattice of characters of the  maximal torus, 
 is the dual lattice (given by the 1-parameter subgroups), 
 is a set of  roots, 
 is the corresponding set of coroots.

Conversely for any root datum there is a reductive algebraic group. A root datum contains slightly more information than the Dynkin diagram, because it also determines the center of the group.

For any root datum , we can define a dual root datum  by switching the characters with the 1-parameter subgroups, and switching the roots with the coroots.

References
Michel Demazure, Exp. XXI in SGA 3 vol 3
T. A. Springer, Reductive groups, in Automorphic forms, representations, and L-functions vol 1 

Representation theory
Algebraic groups